Hamid Reza Rasekh (born 1962) is an Iranian pharmacologist and toxicologist and Professor of Pharmacoeconomics and Pharmaceutical Management at Shaheed Beheshti University of Medical Sciences.

References

External links

Hamid Reza Rasekh at Shaheed Beheshti University of Medical Sciences

1962 births
Living people
Iranian pharmacologists
People from Kerman
Florida A&M University alumni
University of Louisiana at Monroe alumni
Academic staff of Shahid Beheshti University
Iranian toxicologists